Seyyedabad (also Romanized as Seyyedābād) is a village in Ravar Rural District, in the Central District of Ravar County, Kerman Province, Iran. According to the 2006 census, it has a population of 16, in 4 families.

References 

Populated places in Ravar County